Acaulospora capsicula is a species of fungi in the family Acaulosporaceae. It forms arbuscular mycorrhiza and vesicles in roots. It can be distinguished easily from other species of the same genus by spore color and wall structure.

References

External links
Index Fungorum

Diversisporales